The 2001 Hungarian Figure Skating Championships took place in Dunaújváros on January 6–7. Skaters competed in the disciplines of men's singles, ladies' singles, and ice dancing on the senior level. The results were used to choose the Hungarian teams to the 2001 World Championships and the 2001 European Championships.

Results

Men

Ladies

Ice dancing

External links
 results

Hungarian Figure Skating Championships
Hungarian Figure Skating Championships, 2001
Figure skating